Kuranda Range may refer to:

An informal name for the Macalister Range between Cairns and Kuranda
Kuranda Range road, a section of highway that traverses this range
Kuranda Scenic Railway, a scenic tourist rail service that traverses this range